ACV-15 is the designation of an amphibious Infantry fighting vehicle family developed by the Turkish defense company FNSS Savunma Sistemleri A.Ş. This vehicle is also manufactured by DRB-HICOM Defence Technologies (DefTech). The design is an attempt to combine the capabilities of an infantry fighting vehicle (IFV) and an armoured personnel carrier (APC). The ACV-15 is based on the American Advanced Infantry Fighting Vehicle, which in turn is based on the American M113A1 armored personnel carrier.

History

FNSS developed the ACV-15 based on the AIFV to meet the Turkish Land Forces Command's (TLFC's) operational requirement. The first production vehicles were delivered in 1992. The basic AIFV has a one-person power-operated turret armed with a 25mm cannon and 7.62mm co-axial machine gun. FNSS Defense Systems' latest development is the Armored Combat Vehicle – New Generation which has an additional roadwheel each side. This can undertake a wider range of battlefield missions as it has greater internal volume and load-carrying capability. The vehicle is fully amphibious, propelled in the water by its tracks. Standard equipment includes passive night vision equipment, an NBC (nuclear, biological, chemical) protection system and smoke grenade launchers.

The AIFV is in service with Turkey (2,249) and the United Arab Emirates (136 delivered). Malaysia ordered 267 ACV-15 in different versions in 2000, all of which have been delivered.

The Malaysian variant of the AIFV is called the ACV-300 Adnan and is a result of a collaboration between FNSS and DefTech. They are nicknamed the Adnan after Adnan bin Saidi, a Malayan Lieutenant hero who fought in the Battle of Singapore during World War II. The ACV-300s are equipped with a 25mm Sharpshooter Turret and are assembled by DefTech at Pekan, Pahang. 12 units were deployed against Sulu militants in the 2013 Lahad Datu standoff.

The ACV-15 can be fitted with a number of turret choices to tailor to individual customer requirements. They are also equipped with firing ports, which allows infantrymen to fire their weapons from within the vehicle.

The ACV-15 has also been fitted with the turret of a BMP-3 infantry combat vehicle, produced by KBP Instrument Design Bureau of Tula, Russia. The system is called ACV-SW. The BMP-3 turret is armed with a 2A70 100mm semi-automatic rifled gun/missile launcher, which can fire either HE-Frag (High-Explosive Fragmentation) rounds or the 9M117 laser beamriding anti-tank missile.

The Adnan feature KVH TacNav navigation system incorporating GPS, LWD Avimo laser warning device, Wegmann type 76mm grenade launchers, NBC filtration system and ANVVS-2 night vision system.

Variants

Service variants 
 ACV-AAPC (advanced armored personnel carrier) — with a one-man turret with a 12.7 mm machine gun and a 7.62 mm machine gun; 13 troops carried.
 ACV-AIFV
 AIFV with FMC EWS (assembled by DAF Special Products) turret with a 25 mm Oerlikon Contraves 25 mm cannon and a coaxial 7.62 mm machine gun
 AIFV with Giat Dragar turret with a 25 mm M811 cannon and a coaxial 7.62 mm machine gun.
 ACV-ATV — Armored Tow Vehicle. Fitted with a Norwegian one-man turret with two BGM-71 TOW missiles in a ready to launch position, and four troops carried.
 ACV-AMV — Armored Mortar Vehicle. Fitted with an 81 mm mortar and a 7.62 mm machine gun.

Turkish private variants 
 120mm AMV — A private venture, armed with a TDA 120mm recoiling mortar in the rear of the vehicle. Not in service.
 ACV-IFV Sharpshooter — IFV with FNSS Sharpshooter Turret. This variant is now being exported to Malaysia (ACV-300 Adnan).
 ACV with HMTS — armed with four Hellfire missiles in the ready to fire position.
 ACV-300 — Fitted with a 300 hp powerpack similar to the M113A3, but with high power.
 ACV-350 — Fitted with a 350 hp powerpack.
 ACV-S — A stretched version of the AIFV with an additional road wheel and extra armor giving resistance to 14.5mm AP projectiles, with an upgraded 350 or 400 hp powerpack. Weight is 18,000 kg. A variety of turrets are available, including 12.7mm, 25mm (FNSS Sharpshooter Turret) and 30 mm as well as an Eryx missile launcher and 120mm mortar turret.

Operators 

  100 ACV-S in service.
  267 ACV-300 Adnan in service.
  7 ACV-15 in service.
   1, Syrian Arab Army captured an ACV-15 from ISIL, after ISIL captured it from the Turkish Army.
  2,249 ACV-15 in service. Some of these are given to Free Syrian Army (FSA) forces. Since 2016, ACV-15's have been used by the FSA against ISIL and YPG during Operation Euphrates Shield.
  133 ACV-15 in service.
  used by the GNA during the 2019-20 Tripoli offensive (at least 50)

Gallery

References
Notes

External links

 Manufacturer's website
 Timawa.net Philippines Defense Forum
 ACV-S Tracked Armoured Combat Vehicle, Turkey
 ACV-15 IFV FNSS Armored Combat Infantry Fighting Vehicle

Tracked infantry fighting vehicles
Armoured fighting vehicles of Turkey
Infantry fighting vehicles of the Philippines
Armoured personnel carriers of the United Arab Emirates
ACV-15
Military vehicles introduced in the 1990s